Nieborów  is a village in Łowicz County, Łódź Voivodeship, in central Poland. It is the seat of the gmina (administrative district) called Gmina Nieborów.

The village has a population of 900 and is famous for the Arkadia park situated nearby and the Nieborów Palace and park. The palace is a former home of the Radziwill family.

Literature 
 Krzysztof Jabłoński (Photographs) and Włodzimierz Piwkowski (Text), pl./en.: Nieborów. Pałac Radziwiłłów - The Radziwiłł Palace. Wydawnictwo VOYAGER, Warszawa 1992, .

References
 Central Statistical Office (GUS) Population: Size and Structure by Administrative Division - (2007-12-31) (in Polish)

Villages in Łowicz County
Palaces in Poland